Koupé-Manengouba is a division of the Southwest Region in Cameroon. The division covers an area of 3,404 km and in 2005 had a total population of 105,579. The capital of the division is Bangem.

Subdivisions
The Koupé-Manengouba Division is divided administratively into 5 subdivisions and in turn into sub-districts and villages.

Subdivisions 
 Bangem
 Tombel
 Nguti
 NiKongsamba:
 Ebone
 Baré
 Manjo
 Upper Mungo:
Melong
 Santchou
 Kékem

References

Departments of Cameroon
Southwest Region (Cameroon)